The 1998 Pittsburgh Pirates season was the 117th season of the franchise; the 112th in the National League. This was their 29th season at Three Rivers Stadium. The Pirates finished sixth and last in the National League Central with a record of 69–93.

Regular season

Season standings

Game log

|- style="background:#cfc;"
| 1 || April 1 || @ Expos || 4–0 || Cordova (1–0) || Perez || — || 31,220 || 1–0
|- style="background:#cfc;"
| 2 || April 2 || @ Expos || 4–3 || Schmidt (1–0) || Maddux || Loiselle (1) || 6,396 || 2–0
|- style="background:#fbb;"
| 3 || April 3 || @ Mets || 1–2 || McMichael || Peters (0–1) || — || 15,245 || 2–1
|- style="background:#fbb;"
| 4 || April 4 || @ Mets || 6–7 (13) || Wendell || Peters (0–2) || — || 17,633 || 2–2
|- style="background:#fbb;"
| 5 || April 5 || @ Mets || 0–7 || Yoshii || Silva (0–1) || — || 18,205 || 2–3
|- style="background:#cfc;"
| 6 || April 6 || @ Mets || 4–2 || Cordova (2–0) || Jones || Loiselle (2) || 13,528 || 3–3
|- style="background:#fbb;"
| 7 || April 7 || Braves || 3–11 || Glavine || Schmidt (1–1) || — || 43,268 || 3–4
|- style="background:#cfc;"
| 8 || April 8 || Braves || 5–3 || Loaiza (1–0) || Neagle || Loiselle (3) || 11,254 || 4–4
|- style="background:#fbb;"
| 9 || April 9 || Braves || 3–4 || Millwood || Lieber (0–1) || Wohlers || 9,560 || 4–5
|- style="background:#cfc;"
| 10 || April 10 || Marlins || 4–1 || Silva (1–1) || Meadows || Loiselle (4) || 16,561 || 5–5
|- style="background:#cfc;"
| 11 || April 11 || Marlins || 7–6 (10) || Loiselle (1–0) || Powell || — || 19,920 || 6–5
|- style="background:#cfc;"
| 12 || April 12 || Marlins || 7–3 || Schmidt (2–1) || Medina || — || 12,203 || 7–5
|- style="background:#fbb;"
| 13 || April 13 || Marlins || 2–7 || Larkin || Loaiza (1–1) || — || 10,938 || 7–6
|- style="background:#fbb;"
| 14 || April 14 || @ Braves || 0–6 || Millwood || Lieber (0–2) || — || 31,259 || 7–7
|- style="background:#fbb;"
| 15 || April 15 || @ Braves || 0–7 || Maddux || Silva (1–2) || — || 30,381 || 7–8
|- style="background:#fbb;"
| 16 || April 16 || @ Braves || 1–3 || Smoltz || Cordova (2–1) || Wohlers || 35,760 || 7–9
|- style="background:#fbb;"
| 17 || April 17 || Padres || 5–7 || Boehringer || Tabaka (0–1) || Hoffman || 12,555 || 7–10
|- style="background:#fbb;"
| 18 || April 18 || Padres || 5–7 (10) || Miceli || Loiselle (1–1) || Hoffman || 14,728 || 7–11
|- style="background:#fbb;"
| 19 || April 21 || Giants || 3–6 || Gardner || Lieber (0–3) || — || 8,976 || 7–12
|- style="background:#cfc;"
| 20 || April 22 || Giants || 5–2 || Silva (2–2) || Darwin || Loiselle (5) || 11,367 || 8–12
|- style="background:#cfc;"
| 21 || April 23 || Giants || 7–0 || Cordova (3–1) || Estes || — || 9,899 || 9–12
|- style="background:#cfc;"
| 22 || April 24 || @ Padres || 4–2 || Schmidt (3–1) || Smith || Rincon (1) || 26,413 || 10–12
|- style="background:#fbb;"
| 23 || April 25 || @ Padres || 3–4 (16) || Reyes || Martinez (0–1) || — || 53,710 || 10–13
|- style="background:#cfc;"
| 24 || April 26 || @ Padres || 6–0 || Lieber (1–3) || Brown || — || 42,281 || 11–13
|- style="background:#fbb;"
| 25 || April 27 || @ Giants || 5–6 || Nen || Loiselle (1–2) || — || 10,127 || 11–14
|- style="background:#fbb;"
| 26 || April 28 || @ Giants || 1–2 || Estes || Cordova (3–2) || Nen || 11,551 || 11–15
|- style="background:#fbb;"
| 27 || April 30 || Dodgers || 6–14 || Clontz || Dessens (0–1) || — || 9,728 || 11–16
|-

|- style="background:#cfc;"
| 28 || May 1 || Dodgers || 5–4 || Tabaka (1–1) || Dreifort || Loiselle (6) || 15,491 || 12–16
|- style="background:#fbb;"
| 29 || May 2 || Dodgers || 4–5 || Martinez || Lieber (1–4) || Radinsky || 22,629 || 12–17
|- style="background:#fbb;"
| 30 || May 3 || Dodgers || 5–10 || Park || Silva (2–3) || — || 18,674 || 12–18
|- style="background:#cfc;"
| 31 || May 5 || Cardinals || 5–2 || Cordova (4–2) || Mercker || Loiselle (7) || 10,329 || 13–18
|- style="background:#cfc;"
| 32 || May 6 || Cardinals || 5–0 || Schmidt (4–1) || Stottlemyre || — || 12,051 || 14–18
|- style="background:#cfc;"
| 33 || May 7 || Reds || 8–7 || Dessens (1–1) || Belinda || Loiselle (8) || 8,400 || 15–18
|- style="background:#fbb;"
| 34 || May 8 || Reds || 3–5 (10) || Belinda || Rincon (0–1) || Shaw || 13,848 || 15–19
|- style="background:#cfc;"
| 35 || May 9 || Reds || 6–1 || Silva (3–3) || Winchester || Peters (1) || 27,185 || 16–19
|- style="background:#fbb;"
| 36 || May 10 || Reds || 3–4 (12) || Belinda || Loiselle (1–3) || — || 19,507 || 16–20
|- style="background:#cfc;"
| 37 || May 11 || Rockies || 5–2 || Schmidt (5–1) || Ritz || — || 9,498 || 17–20
|- style="background:#cfc;"
| 38 || May 12 || Rockies || 6–0 || Loaiza (2–1) || Wright || — || 12,954 || 18–20
|- style="background:#fbb;"
| 39 || May 13 || @ Astros || 0–1 || Hampton || Lieber (1–5) || Wagner || 14,239 || 18–21
|- style="background:#cfc;"
| 40 || May 14 || @ Astros || 7–2 || Silva (4–3) || Schourek || — || 16,123 || 19–21
|- style="background:#fbb;"
| 41 || May 15 || @ Diamondbacks || 1–6 || Suppan || Cordova (4–3) || — || 43,584 || 19–22
|- style="background:#cfc;"
| 42 || May 16 || @ Diamondbacks || 6–3 || Schmidt (6–1) || Anderson || Loiselle (9) || 48,167 || 20–22
|- style="background:#fbb;"
| 43 || May 17 || @ Diamondbacks || 2–8 || Benes || Loaiza (2–2) || — || 44,014 || 20–23
|- style="background:#fbb;"
| 44 || May 18 || @ Diamondbacks || 2–9 || Blair || Lieber (1–6) || — || 41,465 || 20–24
|- style="background:#cfc;"
| 45 || May 19 || Padres || 3–0 || Silva (5–3) || Hamilton || Loiselle (10) || 10,493 || 21–24
|- style="background:#cfc;"
| 46 || May 20 || Padres || 5–2 || Cordova (5–3) || Ashby || Loiselle (11) || — || 22–24
|- style="background:#fbb;"
| 47 || May 20 || Padres || 3–8 || Hitchcock || Peters (0–3) || — || 17,248 || 22–25
|- style="background:#cfc;"
| 48 || May 21 || Padres || 3–2 || Schmidt (7–1) || Brown || Rincon (2) || 10,222 || 23–25
|- style="background:#fbb;"
| 49 || May 22 || @ Marlins || 1–3 || Hernandez || Loaiza (2–3) || — || 22,057 || 23–26
|- style="background:#cfc;"
| 50 || May 23 || @ Marlins || 10–4 || Lieber (2–6) || Fontenot || Rincon (3) || 30,499 || 24–26
|- style="background:#fbb;"
| 51 || May 24 || @ Marlins || 3–4 || Powell || Christiansen (0–1) || — || 16,972 || 24–27
|- style="background:#fbb;"
| 52 || May 26 || @ Brewers || 2–3 || Myers || Loiselle (1–4) || — || 12,272 || 24–28
|- style="background:#fbb;"
| 53 || May 27 || @ Brewers || 2–3 (10) || Woodall || Rincon (0–2) || — || 10,274 || 24–29
|- style="background:#fbb;"
| 54 || May 29 || Expos || 1–4 || Perez || Lieber (2–7) || Urbina || 17,053 || 24–30
|- style="background:#cfc;"
| 55 || May 30 || Expos || 8–7 || Christiansen (1–1) || Urbina || — || 38,149 || 25–30
|- style="background:#cfc;"
| 56 || May 31 || Expos || 9–4 || Cordova (6–3) || Batista || — || 24,718 || 26–30
|-

|- style="background:#cfc;"
| 57 || June 1 || Mets || 4–3 || Schmidt (8–1) || Mlicki || Rincon (4) || 11,274 || 27–30
|- style="background:#cfc;"
| 58 || June 2 || Mets || 5–2 || Peters (1–3) || Bohanon || Rincon (5) || 9,040 || 28–30
|- style="background:#cfc;"
| 59 || June 3 || Mets || 3–0 || Lieber (3–7) || Reed || Christiansen (1) || 17,691 || 29–30
|- style="background:#cfc;"
| 60 || June 5 || Twins || 6–1 || Silva (6–3) || Morgan || — || 28,446 || 30–30
|- style="background:#cfc;"
| 61 || June 6 || Twins || 4–3 (12) || Loaiza (3–3) || Aguilera || — || 19,809 || 31–30
|- style="background:#fbb;"
| 62 || June 7 || Twins || 2–3 || Serafini || Schmidt (8–2) || Aguilera || 32,773 || 31–31
|- style="background:#fbb;"
| 63 || June 8 || @ Indians || 0–8 || Colon || Peters (1–4) || — || 43,068 || 31–32
|- style="background:#cfc;"
| 64 || June 9 || @ Indians || 7–4 || Lieber (4–7) || Morman || Rincon (6) || 41,762 || 32–32
|- style="background:#cfc;"
| 65 || June 10 || @ Indians || 4–3 (11) || Loaiza (4–3) || Mesa || Loiselle (12) || 43,101 || 33–32
|- style="background:#fbb;"
| 66 || June 12 || Brewers || 2–4 || Karl || Cordova (6–4) || Wickman || 16,851 || 33–33
|- style="background:#fbb;"
| 67 || June 13 || Brewers || 1–8 || Juden || Schmidt (8–3) || — || 28,945 || 33–34
|- style="background:#cfc;"
| 68 || June 14 || Brewers || 7–2 || Peters (2–4) || Woodard || — || 23,755 || 34–34
|- style="background:#fbb;"
| 69 || June 15 || @ Phillies || 1–2 || Beech || Lieber (4–8) || Leiter || 14,411 || 34–35
|- style="background:#fbb;"
| 70 || June 16 || @ Phillies || 7–8 || Dodd || Loiselle (1–5) || — || 24,615 || 34–36
|- style="background:#fbb;"
| 71 || June 17 || @ Phillies || 1–3 || Schilling || Cordova (6–5) || — || 25,694 || 34–37
|- style="background:#cfc;"
| 72 || June 18 || @ Brewers || 1–0 || Dessens (2–1) || Jones || Rincon (7) || 14,774 || 35–37
|- style="background:#fbb;"
| 73 || June 19 || @ Brewers || 1–2 || Woodard || Peters (2–5) || Wickman || 20,935 || 35–38
|- style="background:#cfc;"
| 74 || June 20 || @ Brewers || 4–2 || Lieber (5–8) || Eldred || Rincon (8) || 28,556 || 36–38
|- style="background:#cfc;"
| 75 || June 21 || @ Brewers || 8–7 || Loaiza (5–3) || Juden || Rincon (9) || 22,338 || 37–38
|- style="background:#fbb;"
| 76 || June 22 || White Sox || 4–5 || Castillo || Dessens (2–2) || Karchner || 21,531 || 37–39
|- style="background:#fbb;"
| 77 || June 23 || White Sox || 4–5 || Sirotka || Schmidt (8–4) || Karchner || 20,310 || 37–40
|- style="background:#cfc;"
| 78 || June 24 || @ Royals || 10–3 || Peters (3–5) || Rusch || — || 18,007 || 38–40
|- style="background:#fbb;"
| 79 || June 25 || @ Royals || 1–6 || Belcher || Lieber (5–9) || — || 22,504 || 38–41
|- style="background:#fbb;"
| 80 || June 26 || @ Dodgers || 2–5 || Park || Loaiza (5–4) || Osuna || 52,934 || 38–42
|- style="background:#fbb;"
| 81 || June 27 || @ Dodgers || 0–2 || Valdez || Cordova (6–6) || — || 37,821 || 38–43
|- style="background:#cfc;"
| 82 || June 28 || @ Dodgers || 6–4 || Williams (1–0) || Radinsky || Loiselle (13) || 38,865 || 39–43
|- style="background:#fbb;"
| 83 || June 30 || Tigers || 0–3 || Moehler || Lieber (5–10) || — || 11,760 || 39–44
|-

|- style="background:#fbb;"
| 84 || July 1 || Tigers || 1–9 || Greisinger || Peters (3–6) || — || 18,957 || 39–45
|- style="background:#cfc;"
| 85 || July 2 || Tigers || 5–2 || Loaiza (6–4) || Powell || Loiselle (14) || 34,594 || 40–45
|- style="background:#fbb;"
| 86 || July 3 || @ Cubs || 9–12 || Tapani || Cordova (6–7) || Beck || 40,420 || 40–46
|- style="background:#fbb;"
| 87 || July 4 || @ Cubs || 4–5 || Pisciotta || Schmidt (8–5) || Beck || 37,780 || 40–47
|- style="background:#fbb;"
| 88 || July 5 || @ Cubs || 6–7 || Stevens || Loiselle (1–6) || Beck || 38,742 || 40–48
|- style="background:#fbb;"
| 89 || July 10 || Phillies || 6–7 || Schilling || Cordova (6–8) || — || 18,665 || 40–49
|- style="background:#fbb;"
| 90 || July 11 || Phillies || 0–1 || Portugal || Loiselle (1–7) || Leiter || 30,084 || 40–50
|- style="background:#fbb;"
| 91 || July 12 || Phillies || 4–10 || Loewer || Loaiza (6–5) || — || 34,144 || 40–51
|- style="background:#cfc;"
| 92 || July 13 || Cubs || 6–2 || Lieber (6–10) || Gonzalez || — || 11,772 || 41–51
|- style="background:#fbb;"
| 93 || July 14 || Cubs || 4–7 || Tapani || Peters (3–7) || Beck || 13,405 || 41–52
|- style="background:#cfc;"
| 94 || July 15 || Cubs || 3–0 || Cordova (7–8) || Wood || Rincon (10) || 28,655 || 42–52
|- style="background:#fbb;"
| 95 || July 16 || @ Expos || 5–10 || Pavano || Schmidt (8–6) || Maddux || 8,558 || 42–53
|- style="background:#cfc;"
| 96 || July 17 || @ Expos || 5–1 || Williams (2–0) || Vazquez || Christiansen (2) || 9,380 || 43–53
|- style="background:#cfc;"
| 97 || July 18 || @ Expos || 5–2 || Lieber (7–10) || Boskie || — || 11,499 || 44–53
|- style="background:#cfc;"
| 98 || July 19 || @ Expos || 6–1 || Peters (4–7) || Hermanson || — || 17,558 || 45–53
|- style="background:#cfc;"
| 99 || July 20 || @ Mets || 3–1 || Cordova (8–8) || Yoshii || Rincon (11) || 18,088 || 46–53
|- style="background:#fbb;"
| 100 || July 21 || @ Mets || 0–4 || Reed || Schmidt (8–7) || — || 22,844 || 46–54
|- style="background:#cfc;"
| 101 || July 22 || Marlins || 6–4 || Van Poppel (1–0) || Dempster || Christiansen (3) || 13,544 || 47–54
|- style="background:#cfc;"
| 102 || July 23 || Marlins || 9–1 || Lieber (8–10) || Meadows || — || 11,374 || 48–54
|- style="background:#fbb;"
| 103 || July 24 || Braves || 0–3 || Smoltz || Peters (4–8) || — || 24,776 || 48–55
|- style="background:#cfc;"
| 104 || July 25 || Braves || 4–1 || Cordova (9–8) || Neagle || Christiansen (4) || 41,568 || 49–55
|- style="background:#fbb;"
| 105 || July 26 || Braves || 1–2 || Maddux || Schmidt (8–8) || Ligtenberg || 34,925 || 49–56
|- style="background:#fbb;"
| 106 || July 27 || @ Rockies || 7–8 (13) || Leskanic || McCurry (0–1) || — || 46,024 || 49–57
|- style="background:#fbb;"
| 107 || July 28 || @ Rockies || 6–12 || Astacio || Lieber (8–11) || — || 46,856 || 49–58
|- style="background:#cfc;"
| 108 || July 29 || @ Rockies || 12–1 || Peters (5–8) || Kile || — || 47,411 || 50–58
|- style="background:#fbb;"
| 109 || July 31 || Astros || 4–7 || Hampton || Cordova (9–9) || Henry || 32,476 || 50–59
|-

|- style="background:#fbb;"
| 110 || August 1 || Astros || 1–2 || Lima || Williams (2–1) || — || 19,783 || 50–60
|- style="background:#fbb;"
| 111 || August 2 || Astros || 2–6 || Johnson || Christiansen (1–2) || Elarton || 21,201 || 50–61
|- style="background:#fbb;"
| 112 || August 3 || Rockies || 2–7 || Jones || Lieber (8–12) || — || 11,204 || 50–62
|- style="background:#cfc;"
| 113 || August 4 || Rockies || 13–5 || Christiansen (2–2) || Kile || — || 15,784 || 51–62
|- style="background:#fbb;"
| 114 || August 5 || Rockies || 2–6 || Wright || Cordova (9–10) || — || 12,862 || 51–63
|- style="background:#fbb;"
| 115 || August 6 || Rockies || 1–5 || Thomson || Schmidt (8–9) || — || 14,060 || 51–64
|- style="background:#fbb;"
| 116 || August 7 || @ Dodgers || 1–3 || Bohanon || Van Poppel (1–1) || Shaw || 41,676 || 51–65
|- style="background:#fbb;"
| 117 || August 8 || @ Dodgers || 1–2 || Osuna || Christiansen (2–3) || — || 45,187 || 51–66
|- style="background:#cfc;"
| 118 || August 9 || @ Dodgers || 2–1 || Peters (6–8) || Park || Rincon (12) || 43,227 || 52–66
|- style="background:#cfc;"
| 119 || August 11 || @ Reds || 7–0 || Cordova (10–10) || Tomko || — || 16,399 || 53–66
|- style="background:#cfc;"
| 120 || August 12 || @ Reds || 5–4 || Schmidt (9–9) || Remlinger || Rincon (13) || 16,946 || 54–66
|- style="background:#cfc;"
| 121 || August 13 || @ Reds || 9–6 || McCurry (1–1) || Harnisch || Rincon (14) || 16,002 || 55–66
|- style="background:#fbb;"
| 122 || August 14 || @ Cardinals || 5–10 || Osborne || Lieber (8–13) || — || 47,836 || 55–67
|- style="background:#fbb;"
| 123 || August 15 || @ Cardinals || 7–8 (12) || Painter || McCurry (1–2) || — || 46,817 || 55–68
|- style="background:#cfc;"
| 124 || August 16 || @ Cardinals || 4–1 || Cordova (11–10) || Morris || Lieber (1) || 46,904 || 56–68
|- style="background:#cfc;"
| 125 || August 18 || Dodgers || 6–4 || Schmidt (10–9) || Perez || Loiselle (15) || 12,730 || 57–68
|- style="background:#cfc;"
| 126 || August 19 || Dodgers || 6–5 || Williams (3–1) || Bohanon || Christiansen (5) || 27,259 || 58–68
|- style="background:#cfc;"
| 127 || August 20 || Reds || 6–5 || Christiansen (3–3) || Graves || — || 13,137 || 59–68
|- style="background:#cfc;"
| 128 || August 21 || Reds || 14–2 || Peters (7–8) || Tomko || — || 17,007 || 60–68
|- style="background:#cfc;"
| 129 || August 22 || Cardinals || 14–4 || Cordova (12–10) || Witt || — || 45,082 || 61–68
|- style="background:#cfc;"
| 130 || August 23 || Cardinals || 4–3 || Schmidt (11–9) || Mercker || Christiansen (6) || 42,134 || 62–68
|-
| 131 || August 24 || Cardinals || 5–5 (7) || — || — || — || 28,435 || 62–68
|- style="background:#cfc;"
| 132 || August 25 || @ Diamondbacks || 9–6 || Lawrence (1–0) || Sodowsky || Loiselle (16) || 38,960 || 63–68
|- style="background:#cfc;"
| 133 || August 26 || @ Diamondbacks || 4–3 || Tabaka (2–1) || Daal || Loiselle (17) || 39,906 || 64–68
|- style="background:#fbb;"
| 134 || August 28 || @ Astros || 0–2 || Johnson || Cordova (12–11) || — || 40,709 || 64–69
|- style="background:#fbb;"
| 135 || August 29 || @ Astros || 3–6 || Lima || Schmidt (11–10) || Powell || 41,762 || 64–70
|- style="background:#fbb;"
| 136 || August 30 || @ Astros || 4–11 || Reynolds || McCurry (1–3) || — || 25,342 || 64–71
|-

|- style="background:#fbb;"
| 137 || September 1 || Diamondbacks || 3–4 || Daal || Peters (7–9) || Olson || 11,427 || 64–72
|- style="background:#fbb;"
| 138 || September 2 || Diamondbacks || 1–2 (11) || Small || Tabaka (2–2) || Olson || 12,010 || 64–73
|- style="background:#fbb;"
| 139 || September 3 || Diamondbacks || 0–1 || Anderson || Cordova (12–12) || — || 8,610 || 64–74
|- style="background:#fbb;"
| 140 || September 4 || Cubs || 2–5 || Karchner || Williams (3–2) || Beck || 36,510 || 64–75
|- style="background:#fbb;"
| 141 || September 5 || Cubs || 4–8 || Tapani || Lawrence (1–1) || Beck || 37,711 || 64–76
|- style="background:#cfc;"
| 142 || September 6 || Cubs || 4–3 (10) || Loiselle (2–7) || Stevens || — || 22,209 || 65–76
|- style="background:#fbb;"
| 143 || September 7 || Brewers || 3–6 || Roque || Dessens (2–3) || Wickman || 12,830 || 65–77
|- style="background:#cfc;"
| 144 || September 8 || Brewers || 8–7 || Williams (4–2) || Plunk || Loiselle (18) || 7,171 || 66–77
|- style="background:#fbb;"
| 145 || September 9 || @ Cubs || 2–4 || Clark || Schmidt (11–11) || Beck || 34,857 || 66–78
|- style="background:#fbb;"
| 146 || September 10 || @ Cubs || 2–5 || Tapani || Silva (6–4) || Beck || 38,722 || 66–79
|- style="background:#cfc;"
| 147 || September 11 || @ Phillies || 6–1 || Peters (8–9) || Loewer || — || 16,597 || 67–79
|- style="background:#fbb;"
| 148 || September 12 || @ Phillies || 4–13 || Portugal || Dessens (2–4) || — || 19,329 || 67–80
|- style="background:#fbb;"
| 149 || September 13 || @ Phillies || 1–4 || Byrd || Cordova (12–13) || Leiter || 19,662 || 67–81
|- style="background:#fbb;"
| 150 || September 14 || @ Cardinals || 3–7 || Jimenez || Schmidt (11–12) || — || 42,265 || 67–82
|- style="background:#cfc;"
| 151 || September 15 || @ Cardinals || 8–6 || Lawrence (2–1) || Osborne || Loiselle (19) || — || 68–82
|- style="background:#fbb;"
| 152 || September 15 || @ Cardinals || 3–9 || Aybar || Silva (6–5) || Acevedo || 41,271 || 68–83
|- style="background:#fbb;"
| 153 || September 16 || @ Cardinals || 0–4 || Morris || Van Poppel (1–2) || — || 39,758 || 68–84
|- style="background:#fbb;"
| 154 || September 18 || Astros || 2–5 || Johnson || Dessens (2–5) || Powell || 16,937 || 68–85
|- style="background:#cfc;"
| 155 || September 19 || Astros || 7–1 || Cordova (13–13) || Lima || — || 20,670 || 69–85
|- style="background:#fbb;"
| 156 || September 20 || Astros || 0–2 || Reynolds || Schmidt (11–13) || Wagner || 23,657 || 69–86
|- style="background:#fbb;"
| 157 || September 21 || @ Giants || 1–8 || Hershiser || Silva (6–6) || — || 15,695 || 69–87
|- style="background:#fbb;"
| 158 || September 22 || @ Giants || 2–14 || Rueter || Lieber (8–14) || — || 16,228 || 69–88
|- style="background:#fbb;"
| 159 || September 23 || @ Giants || 1–4 || Gardner || Peters (8–10) || Nen || 13,915 || 69–89
|- style="background:#fbb;"
| 160 || September 24 || @ Giants || 2–6 || Ortiz || Dessens (2–6) || — || 16,754 || 69–90
|- style="background:#fbb;"
| 161 || September 25 || @ Reds || 1–4 || Bere || Cordova (13–14) || Graves || 17,429 || 69–91
|- style="background:#fbb;"
| 162 || September 26 || @ Reds || 2–6 || Harnisch || Schmidt (11–14) || White || 19,391 || 69–92
|- style="background:#fbb;"
| 163 || September 27 || @ Reds || 1–4 || Tomko || Silva (6–7) || — || 19,360 || 69–93
|-

|-
| Legend:       = Win       = Loss       = TieBold = Pirates team member

Record vs. opponents

Detailed records

Roster

Opening Day lineup

Player stats
Batting
Note: G = Games played; AB = At bats; H = Hits; Avg. = Batting average; HR = Home runs; RBI = Runs batted in

Pitching
Note: G = Games pitched; IP = Innings pitched; W = Wins; L = Losses; ERA = Earned run average; SO = Strikeouts

Awards and honors

1998 Major League Baseball All-Star Game
Jason Kendall, C, reserve

Notable transactions
 July 17, 1998: Esteban Loaiza was traded by the Pirates to the Texas Rangers for Warren Morris and Todd Van Poppel.

Farm system

References

 1998 Pittsburgh Pirates team page at Baseball Reference
 1998 Pittsburgh Pirates team page at www.baseball-almanac.com

Pittsburgh Pirates seasons
Pittsburgh Pirates Season, 1998
Pittsburgh Pirates Season, 1998
Pitts